Ed Halmagyi (born February 1975), also known as "Fast Ed," is an Australian TV presenter, chef, author, photographer and radio host.

Early life 
Ed Halmagyi was born in Melbourne, Victoria, Australia in February 1975 to neurologist Dr Gabor Michael Halmagyi AO and bush regenerator Sue Halmagyi OAM who were both immigrants from Hungary. He has an older sister Catherine and a younger brother Nicholas.

At 15 Halmagyi began his culinary career as a kitchenhand, then soon afterwards as an assistant chef. Throughout his school years at Trinity Grammar School, Halmagyi worked in a variety of Sydney restaurants, then undertook a Bachelor of Arts/Law at Sydney University. He continued to work as a chef alongside his studies. In 1995 he travelled to the Solomon Islands to participate in a program of community development and aid work.

Subsequently, Halmagyi has undertaken a Bachelor of Business degree through Southern Cross University (not yet completed) and qualified as a beekeeper.

Career 
Ed Halmagyi is best known for his role on Network 7's lifestyle show Better Homes and Gardens, where he has been a member of the cast since 2003. He also contributes to the monthly magazine of the same name.

He has also been the host for three seasons of the travel show Discover Tasmania, as well as hosting his own afternoon cooking show Fast Ed's Fast Food.

As an author, Halmagyi has published five cookbooks – Nove Cucina (2004), Dinner in 10 (2009), An Hour's the Limit (2010), The Food Clock: A Year of Eating Seasonally (2012) and The Everyday Kitchen (2017).

Additionally, he writes a weekly syndicated column for the News Local network of newspapers, produced his own magazine called Better Basics, as well as contributing to a variety of other magazines in Australia and abroad.

Halmagyi is also a successful commercial photographer, running a food and product media business in Sydney, specialising in editorial imagery and commercial product work.

Commercially, Halmagyi works as a brand ambassador for Mitsubishi Electric, Ingham Poultry and Décor Australia. He is also the Ambassador for A Taste of Harmony.

As a chef and pastry chef, Halmagyi's resume includes stints at the iconic Rockpool and Bennelong in Sydney, as well as Cruise, Beach Road and Nove Cucina. He names his favourite job working at the Wickaninnish Inn in Tofino, Canada.

Media 
He is a regular guest on ABC Radio 702, and the Better Homes and Gardens Radio.

Personal life 
He lives in Bilgola, Sydney, with his graphic designer wife Leah, daughter and son. His hobbies include running, AFL and gardening. Over the last decade Halmagyi has undertaken significant charitable work with a range or organisations, including the Dry July Foundation, Cancer Council NSW and others.

Halmagyi continues to play competitive sport as a member of the Pittwater Phantoms Australian Rules team.

References

Sources
1) Professional Website: https://archive.today/20121230134040/http://www.fast-ed.com.au/home/

2) Professional Website: http://www.roughcutstudio.com.au/

3) Biography at Random House Publishing: http://www.randomhouse.com.au/Author/Halmagyi,%20Ed

4) Ed's Discover Tasmania Blogsite: https://web.archive.org/web/20091029234708/http://blog.tv.discovertasmania.com/

5) Better Homes And Gardens Biography: http://au.lifestyle.yahoo.com/better-homes-gardens/tv/meet/article/-/5825996/ed-halmagyi/

Australian television presenters
Australian television chefs
Living people
Australian people of Hungarian descent
1975 births